The 8th Central People's Committee (CPC) of North Korea was elected by the 1st Session of the 8th Supreme People's Assembly on 30 December 1986. It was replaced on 26 May 1990 by the 9th CPC.

Members

References

Citations

Bibliography
Books:
 

8th Supreme People's Assembly
Central People's Committee
1986 establishments in North Korea
1990 disestablishments in North Korea